Suddenly is the tenth studio album by Canadian musician Dan Snaith, released under the moniker Caribou by Merge Records and City Slang on February 28, 2020. It is Snaith's fifth album as Caribou, and his first since Our Love (2014).

Background and recording
Snaith had approximately 900 "draft ideas" for the album that he cut down to 12 complete tracks. The album's themes include the nature and constant evolution of relationships with family and friends. Snaith named the album Suddenly because of his daughter's "obsession with the word".

Critical reception

Tom Sloman of DIY stated that the album "continues Caribou's knack of releasing albums that are both accessible and explorative". Seth Wilson of Slant Magazine wrote that "What makes the album so spectacular, though, is Snaith's voice. This is the first Caribou effort on which he sings on every track, and his vocals are mixed higher than they have been in the past. Throughout, his mesmerizing vocals elevate songs that might otherwise scan as banal." Wilson also felt that "The album rewards [...] reference-spotting, and it's a treat to listen to the way such a masterful musician mines his own record collection for inspiration." Reviewing the album for NME, Thomas Smith felt that "Your history with Snaith's catalogue will dictate which elements of 'Suddenly' are most intriguing. The more experimental and unsettling elements will reward longtime stans, while recent converts will be just as thrilled with its party-starting exuberance."

Writing for Resident Advisor, Carlos Hawthorn called the album a "slight pivot away from the dance floor" that "has its ravey moments, but overall there's less chugging and thudding and more of a focus on songwriting. The energy swings wildly from zany pop and Technicolor house to tender ballads with no beat." He ultimately judged the album to be a "frustrating listen. Snaith's talent for writing earworms, hooks and choruses has never been so apparent. But overall he sounds like he's trying too hard, taking influence from too many places."

The album won the Juno Award for Electronic Album of the Year at the Juno Awards of 2021.

Accolades

Track listing

Charts

References

2020 albums
Dan Snaith albums
Merge Records albums
City Slang albums
Juno Award for Electronic Album of the Year albums